Crataerina is a genus of  louse flies in the family Hippoboscidae. All are parasites of birds, feeding on the blood of various species of Apodidae (swifts) and Hirundinidae (swallows and martins). The genus is sometimes spelled Craterina.

Species
C. acutipennis Austen, 1926 - hosts include Apus affinis, A. caffer, A. horus, A. pallidus, A. unicolor
C. debilis Maa, 1975
C. hirundinis (Linnaeus, 1758) - hosts include  Delichon urbicum, D. dasypus, Hirundo rustica, Riparia riparia, Ptyonoprogne rupestris
C. melbae (Rondani, 1879) - hosts include  Apus melba, A. pacificus cooki, A. apus, Tachymarptis aequatorialis.
C. obtusipennis Austen, 1926
C. pacifica Iwasa, 2001 - hosts include  Apus pacificus
C. pallida (Olivier in Latreille, 1812) - hosts include  Apus apus
C. seguyi Falcoz, 1929 - hosts include  Alopochelidon fuscata, Notiochelidon cyanoleuca, N. murina

References

Parasitic flies
Parasites of birds
Hippoboscoidea genera
Hippoboscidae
Taxa named by Ignaz von Olfers